Gazk (also Romanized as Gazak; also known as Gaz and Kaz) is a village in Horjand Rural District, Kuhsaran District, Ravar County, Kerman Province, Iran. At the 2006 census, its population was 332, in 83 families.

References 

Populated places in Ravar County